Curtis Hodges Jr. (born July 3, 1999) is an American football tight end for the Washington Commanders of the National Football League (NFL). He played college football at Arizona State and was signed by Washington as an undrafted free agent in 2022.

College career
Hodges played for the Arizona State Sun Devils from 2017 to 2021, where he recorded 36 receptions for 601 yards and four touchdowns.

Professional career

He was signed by the Washington Commanders as an undrafted free agent on May 1, 2022. He was placed on injured reserve on September 1, 2022.

References

External links

Washington Commanders bio
Arizona State Sun Devils bio

1999 births
Living people
Players of American football from Arizona
American football tight ends
Arizona State Sun Devils football players
Washington Commanders players
Sportspeople from Mesa, Arizona
American football wide receivers